Dibri-Assirikro (also spelled Dibri-Asrikro) is a town in central Ivory Coast. It is a sub-prefecture of Sakassou Department in Gbêkê Region, Vallée du Bandama District.

Dibri-Assirikro was a commune until March 2012, when it became one of 1126 communes nationwide that were abolished.

In 2014, the population of the sub-prefecture of Dibri-Assirikro was 16,153.

Villages
The 80 villages of the sub-prefecture of Dibri-Assirikro and their population in 2014 are:

Notes

Sub-prefectures of Gbêkê
Former communes of Ivory Coast